Ross Daniel Fisher (born 22 November 1980) is an English professional golfer who plays on the European Tour, where he has won five times, including the 2009 Volvo World Match Play Championship at Finca Cortesin Golf Club in Spain.

Early life
Fisher was born in Ascot, Berkshire. His home course is the famous Wentworth Golf Club, Surrey, England, the location of the European Tour administrative headquarters. As a child, he attended Charters School, a state comprehensive close to Wentworth.

Professional career
Fisher joined the European Tour in 2006. He earned his card by finishing 18th on the Challenge Tour's money list in 2005. During Fisher's first season on the European Tour he won a Jaguar for a nearest to the pin contest in the 2006 Quinn Direct British Masters.

In 2007, Fisher won the KLM Open by one stroke over Joost Luiten, and subsequently finished the year ranked 43rd on the Order of Merit. Fisher started the 2008 season with a joint-second place in the HSBC Champions tournament in Shanghai, beaten by Phil Mickelson in a three-way play-off that also featured Lee Westwood.

In July 2008, Fisher won the European Open on the Heritage Course at The London Golf Club; the first staging of the event at the venue in Kent, England. Despite never having played the course either in competition or in practice, Fisher shot a first round 63—the lowest round thus far in his professional career—which featured a wind-assisted 413-yard drive on the 9th hole, his last of the day. Having established a first round lead, he was never subsequently headed at the top of the leaderboard, going on to win the tournament by a comfortable seven shots from Sergio García. Fisher played steadily for the rest of the season and finished sixth on the Tour's Order of Merit.

Fisher's progress continued in 2009 when he reached the semi-final of the WGC-Accenture Match Play Championship in Arizona, losing to fellow Englishman Paul Casey 4 & 3. Fisher also finished second at the BMW PGA Championship at Wentworth Club, after shooting a 64 in his final round, which included 6 birdies in the first 12 holes. Fisher's 64 was just a shot outside the Wentworth course record and he finished a stroke behind the winner Paul Casey. Fisher was in contention during the final round of the 2009 U.S. Open at Bethpage Black, New York up until a three-putt bogey at the par three 17th hole. Fisher finished in 5th place, three shots behind the champion Lucas Glover. The following month, at the 138th Open Championship at Turnberry, Fisher held a two-stroke lead in the early stages of the final round, before taking a quadruple-bogey eight on the par four 5th hole after driving into long rough on the right side of the hole. He eventually finished in a tie for 13th place.

In 2009, Fisher had the lowest cumulative score for the four major championships for players who made the cut in all four events. Fisher's cumulative score of +2 was one stroke better than Henrik Stenson of Sweden. At the end of 2009, Fisher won the first Volvo World Match Play Championship that was held away from Wentworth, defeating American Anthony Kim 4 & 3 in the final at Finca Cortesín Golf Club in Spain. The win lifted him to 17th in the world rankings and he finished the season in fourth place in the Race to Dubai.

Fisher finished runner-up to David Horsey in June 2010 BMW International Open. The following month he had an excellent chance to shoot a round of 59 and thus make European Tour golf history at the 3 Irish Open in Killarney, when he was 10-under-par with four holes to play, only needing to birdie two of the remaining four holes, but he parred the last four holes for a round of 61. He won the tournament with an 18-under-par score of 266. Fisher qualified for the 2010 European Ryder Cup team, which regained the trophy from the United States at Celtic Manor, Wales, on 4 October. He contributed two points towards the European team total and finished with a record of 2–2–0.

After his successes from 2008 to 2010, Fisher had three disappointing seasons in 2011, 2012 to 2013. Fisher was joint 15th in the 2011 Masters Tournament but finished the year with a world ranking of 100. He was runner-up three times in these three seasons; in the Nordea Masters and the Portugal Masters in 2012 and the 2013 Perth International. Fisher was 52nd, 38th and 40th in the Order of Merit in these three seasons.

In March 2014, Fisher won his fifth European Tour title at the Tshwane Open in South Africa, his first win since 2010. Fisher won by three strokes over Michael Hoey and Daniel van Tonder, having entered the day five ahead of the field. Fisher lost in a three-man playoff for the BMW Masters, the first of the Final Series events that concluded the European Tour season. Marcel Siem won the tournament with a birdie at the first extra hole. The good result enable Fisher to finish the season 20th in the Race to Dubai.

Fisher started the 2015 European Tour season playing in the Nedbank Golf Challenge at the end of 2014, where he finished second behind Danny Willett. This and a third-place finish in the 2015 WGC-HSBC Champions were his best results of the season. The early part of 2016 was disappointing but, late in the season, he was runner-up in the Porsche European Open and the Alfred Dunhill Links Championship and finished in the top-20 of the Race to Dubai for the third successive season.

In 2017, he broke the record for the lowest score on the Old Course at St Andrews with a 61.

Personal life
Fisher is married to Joanne with whom he has a daughter, Eve. Joanne gave birth to the couple's second child in 2011 named Harry.

Amateur wins
2003 Sunningdale Foursomes (with Simon Griffiths), Finnish Amateur Open Championship, Berkshire Trophy (tie with Adam Blyth)
2004 Sunningdale Foursomes (with Simon Griffiths)

Professional wins (5)

European Tour wins (5)

1Co-sanctioned by the Sunshine Tour

European Tour playoff record (0–5)

Results in major championships

CUT = missed the half-way cut
"T" = tied

Summary

Most consecutive cuts made – 4 (twice, current)
Longest streak of top-10s – 1

Results in The Players Championship

CUT = missed the halfway cut

Results in World Golf Championships
Results not in chronological order before 2015.

QF, R16, R32, R64 = Round in which player lost in match play
"T" = tied
Note that the HSBC Champions did not become a WGC event until 2009.

Team appearances
Amateur
European Amateur Team Championship (representing England): 2003

Professional
World Cup (representing England): 2008, 2009
Seve Trophy (representing Great Britain & Ireland): 2009 (winners), 2011 (winners)
Ryder Cup (representing Europe): 2010 (winners)
EurAsia Cup (representing Europe): 2016 (winners), 2018 (winners)

Ryder Cup points record

See also
2005 Challenge Tour graduates
2005 European Tour Qualifying School graduates
2012 PGA Tour Qualifying School graduates

References

External links

English male golfers
European Tour golfers
PGA Tour golfers
Ryder Cup competitors for Europe
People from Ascot, Berkshire
People from Cheam
1980 births
Living people